Stealing Tarantino is a 2006 comedy-crime film by director Roman Kachanov. The film is of Russian origin and is in both English and Russian. Actors in the film include Cathy Carlson, Steve Fix, Dave Fraunces.

Plot 
The film revolves around the story of a group of very wealthy Kalmyks Russian who are attempting to steal a new Quentin Tarantino film (Tarantino was portrayed by actor Yegor Barinov) before it is officially released. They plan on showing the unseen film at their children's wedding.

References

External links 
 

2006 television films
2006 films
2000s crime comedy films
Films directed by Roman Kachanov
2006 Russian television series debuts